The Brügger & Thomet MP9 (Maschinenpistole 9mm, German for "machine pistol") is a submachine gun chambered for the 9×19mm Parabellum cartridge that is designed and manufactured by Brügger & Thomet.

The MP9 is a selective-fire submachine gun. It uses 15, 20, 25, and 30 round transparent polymer detachable box magazines. It has three safeties: an ambidextrous safety/fire mode selector switch button (manual safety), a trigger safety, and a drop safety. The MP9 is a development of the Steyr TMP. The design of the TMP was purchased from Steyr in 2001. Differences from the TMP include a stock that folds to the right side of the weapon, an integrated Picatinny rail, and a new trigger safety.

Variants
The TP9 is a semi-automatic civilian variant of MP9. Its design is similar to the Steyr SPP, but its differential feature is an underbarrel MIL-STD-1913 Picatinny Rail, which is installed in front of the trigger guard, in place of the forward grip. This was to done to comply with US firearm import laws. The TP9SF is superficially similar, though it is selective-fire rather than semi-auto only. A version chambered in 6.5×25mm CBJ was developed in 2010, requiring only a barrel change to accept the new caliber.

Later variants (TP9-N, TP9-US, MP9-N, MP45) have new designed ambidextrous two/three-position selectors. The old Steyr style cross-bolt push button selectors are replaced with new "HK" style selectors.
With the TP9-N B&T decided to add an empty socket (which also includes the hand-stop) for the foregrip, instead of a picatinny rail as with the old TP9. It also comes without a stock, but with an attachment point that can fit various folding or telescoping braces and stocks, should a customer decide to register it as a short barreled rifle and add one. This version is named the TP9-US. The regular TP9-N is identical to the MP9-N, just without full-auto capability.

Known users

See also
 Beretta 93R
Glock 18
Heckler & Koch VP70
 Minebea PM-9
Patria
 PP-2000

References

External links
 B&T website
 Review of the TP9 Pistol from American Rifleman

Machine pistols
9mm Parabellum submachine guns
Submachine guns of Switzerland